Public Health is a monthly peer-reviewed public health journal. It was established in 1888 and is published by Elsevier on behalf of the Royal Society for Public Health. The editors-in-chief are Phil Mackie (NHS Health Scotland) and Fiona Sim (National Health Service). According to the Journal Citation Reports, the journal has a 2021 impact factor of 4.984.

References

External links

Public health journals
Publications established in 1888
Elsevier academic journals
Bimonthly journals
English-language journals
Academic journals associated with learned and professional societies of the United Kingdom